is a passenger railway station located in the city of  Matsudo, Chiba Prefecture, Japan operated by the private railway operator Ryūtetsu. It is numbered station RN3.

Lines
Kogane-Jōshi Station is served by the Nagareyama Line, and is located 2.8 km from the official starting point of the line at Mabashi Station.

Station layout
The station consists of one island platform connected to the station building by a footbridge.

Nagareyama Line

History
Kogane-Jōshi Station was opened on December 24, 1953.

Passenger statistics
In fiscal 2018, the station was used by an average of 1629 passengers daily.

Surrounding area
 Chiba Aiyukai Memorial Hospital
 Chiba Prefectural Kogane High School
 Matsudo City Kogane Junior High School

See also
 List of railway stations in Japan

References

External links

 official home page  

Railway stations in Japan opened in 1953
Railway stations in Chiba Prefecture
Matsudo